Ready Player One is a 2011 science fiction novel, and the debut novel of American author Ernest Cline. The story, set in a dystopia  in 2045, follows protagonist Wade Watts on his search for an Easter egg in a worldwide virtual reality game, the discovery of which would lead him to inherit the game creator's fortune. Cline sold the rights to publish the novel in June 2010, in a bidding war to the Crown Publishing Group (a division of Random House). The book was published on August 16, 2011. An audiobook was released the same day; it was narrated by Wil Wheaton, who was mentioned briefly in one of the chapters. In 2012, the book received an Alex Award from the Young Adult Library Services Association division of the American Library Association and won the 2011 Prometheus Award.

A film adaptation, screenwritten by Cline and Zak Penn and directed by Steven Spielberg, was released on March 29, 2018. A sequel novel, Ready Player Two, was released on November 24, 2020, to a widely negative critical reception.

Synopsis

Setting
In the 2040s, the world has been gripped by an energy crisis from the depletion of fossil fuels and the consequences of pollution, global warming and overpopulation, causing widespread social problems, poverty, and economic stagnation. To escape the decline their world is facing, people turn to the OASIS, a virtual reality simulator accessible by players using visors and haptic technology such as gloves. It functions both as an MMORPG and as a virtual world, with its currency being the most stable in the real world. It was created by James Donovan Halliday, founder of Gregarious Simulation Systems (formerly Gregarious Games), who made a posthumous video of his will stating to the public that he had left an Easter egg inside the OASIS, and the first person to find it would inherit his entire fortune, ownership of his corporation as well as complete control of the OASIS itself, which is worth trillions. The story follows the adventures of Wade Watts, starting about five years after the announcement, when he discovers one of the three keys which unlock three successive gates leading to the treasure.

Plot 

Teenager Wade Watts lives with his aunt in Oklahoma City in the "stacks", a poverty-stricken district constructed of trailer homes piled on top of each other. He spends his spare time as a "gunter" ("egg hunter"), logging on to the OASIS as an avatar under the moniker Parzival, reading Halliday's journal Anorak's Almanac, and researching details of the 1980s pop culture, mainly classic video games and movies, that Halliday loved. One day, he realizes that the first key is located on Ludus, the same virtual world as his own online high school, in a re-creation of the Dungeons & Dragons module Tomb of Horrors. He meets Art3mis, a famous female gunter and blogger, and advances further than she does when he defeats the AI Acererak at the video game Joust. He is awarded the Copper Key, and appears on the "Scoreboard", attracting the world's attention.

Parzival completes the Copper Gate's puzzles on the planet Middletown, which is modeled after Halliday's boyhood home.  He plays through the Dungeons of Daggorath video game in a recreation of Halliday's parents' house and then role-playing Matthew Broderick's character in the film WarGames. Art3mis clears the gate shortly afterwards, as does Wade's best friend Aech. Wade's fame enables him to make a living by endorsing virtual products. It also brings him to the attention of Nolan Sorrento, head of operations at Innovative Online Industries (IOI), a multinational corporation bent on a well-funded effort to find the Easter egg in order to take control of the OASIS and monetize it. When Wade refuses to join IOI, Sorrento attempts to kill him by blowing up the stacks where Wade lives, killing his aunt and disguising the explosion as a meth lab accident.

Wade escapes and moves to Columbus, Ohio (hometown of both GSS and IOI), where he assumes the pseudonym Bryce Lynch and living in an anonymous apartment designed for hardcore OASIS users. He begins a wary friendship with Art3mis, but when he asks her out, she declines.

After Five months pass, Art3mis finally finds the Jade Key, and Parzival believes it to be on Archaide, a planet containing a copy of every video game ever made, where he plays a perfect game of Pac-Man, thinking it part of the Egg hunt, but receives only a quarter as a prize. Aech, after finding the Jade Key, provides a hint leading him to the planet Frobozz where he solves a recreation of the text adventure game Zork and whistles a 2600-hertz-sound through a Cap'n Crunch Bo'Sun whistle. Sorrento establishes a base there to farm Jade Keys for their company's avatars, unlocks the second Gate, and rapidly acquires the Crystal Key as well through trial and error.  Shoto, another high ranking Gunter tells Parzival that Sixers have killed his partner Daito, passing it off as a Japanese suicide.

Parzival unlocks the Jade Gate, a Voight-Kampff machine, by entering a privately-owned Blade Runner-themed building, and completes the arcade game Black Tiger and is awarded a virtual mecha as the prize and another clue:  a red star in a circle. He acquires the Crystal Key on planet Syrinx, and after playing the "Discovery" section of the song "2112", finds a clue regarding the conditions to unlock the final gate. As he messages Art3mis, Aech, and Shoto with instructions on how to get through the Jade Gate and obtain the Crystal Key, Sorrento ends his covert attempts to clear the third gate, located in the fortress of Halliday's avatar, Castle Anorak, on planet Chthonia, and places an indestructible force field around it.

Wade manipulates his assumed identity in order to be arrested and placed in indentured servitude in IOI's tech support department. He then uses black market passwords and security exploits to hack into IOI's intranet and acquires a wealth of incriminating information: footage of Daito's murder, the attempt on his own life, as well as plans to abduct Shoto and Art3mis and force them to find the Easter egg for IOI, then kill them afterwards.  Aech remains anonymous due to his mobile setup. After escaping the corporation, he shares his information with his friends and publicizes a gathering of avatars to storm the castle. They are interrupted by Ogden Morrow, who offers them a safe haven at his home in Oregon. Wade meets the real-life Aech and Ogden, but not Art3mis or Shoto, who are already hooked into Ogden's immersion pods.

The day of the battle, Wade uses a previously deployed booby trap to bring down the barricade, and a massive fight among avatars ensues. Parzival, Art3mis, Aech and Shoto use their Mechas to fight Sorrento's Mechagodzilla Kiryu, though Parzival has to use his Ultraman artifact to defeat and kill Sorrento's mecha and avatar.  IOI use a doomsday device artifact called the Cataclyst to destroy the castle and all avatars in the entire sector. Parzival survives because having the Pac-Man quarter granted him an extra life. As he enters the Crystal Gate, he announces that if he wins the final challenge, he will share his fortune with the three of his friends.  He plays Tempest, role-plays King Arthur and various other characters in Monty Python and the Holy Grail, and retrieves the Easter egg in Adventure. His victory grants him control of the OASIS. Sorrento is arrested for the murder of Daito and conspiring to kill Wade and the others. Back in Oregon, Wade and Art3mis, whose actual name is Samantha, meet in person and rekindle their relationship with a kiss.

Characters
   Parzival: The viewpoint character, an orphan living with his aunt in the "stacks" surrounding metropolitan Oklahoma City. Wade names his OASIS character Parzival after the Arthurian knight involved in the quest for the holy grail. Wade's character was based on a mix of Cline as well as his geek friends. 
  a.k.a. Anorak the All Knowing: The creator of OASIS. His avatar's name is based on a British slang term for an obsessive geek. His character was initially inspired by Willy Wonka who Cline described as a "rich eccentric holding a fantastic contest". Cline used the personalities of Howard Hughes and Richard Garriott, and placed Halliday's birth year around the same as his own so that his pop culture interests would coincide with Cline's "and the other middle-aged uber-geeks I know".
  (pronounced like the letter H) a.k.a Helen Harris: Wade's best friend, fellow gunter, and rival in the quest to find the egg. Although Aech's avatar is an athletic white heterosexual male, Aech is played by an African-American lesbian named Helen Harris, who grew up in Atlanta, Georgia and is about the same age as Wade. Aech is based partly on Cline's friend Harry Knowles as well as himself and other geeks, both men and women.
  a.k.a. Art3mis: A famous female gunter and blogger. She chose her avatar's name from the Greek goddess of the hunt. Like other characters, Cline based Art3mis on himself and other geeks, both men, and women. 
  a.k.a. The Great and Powerful Og: Co-creator of the OASIS and best friend of James Halliday. His appearance and personality are described in the book as being "a cross between Albert Einstein and Santa Claus". Ogden's character and relationship with Halliday were inspired by Steve Jobs and Steve Wozniak, with Morrow being more like Jobs as a "charismatic tech leader", while his avatar's name is inspired by the Wizard of Oz.
 : One of the two Japanese gunters who rise to the top of the scoreboard early on in the hunt, working in a team with his "brother" Shoto. He took his avatar's name from the name of the long sword in a daisho set, which is a katana on its own. They are both based on otaku: Japanese geeks who enjoy movies and anime, as well as hikikomori: people who live as recluses inside their family's homes, referred to in the book as "the Missing Millions". Daito's real name is revealed to be Toshiro Yoshiaki after he is killed by the IOI.
 : The second and younger of the two Japanese gunters working as a team in their quest for the egg. He took his avatar's name from the name of the shorter sword of a daisho set, which is a wakizashi on its own. Shoto's real name is Akihide Karatsu. 
  a.k.a. IOI-655321: The head of operations at Innovative Online Industries (IOI), the multinational corporation that serves as an Internet service provider for most of the world. Cline said that he named Sorrento after Nolan Bushnell, founder of the video game company Atari and said "Not that I think Nolan is a bad guy or anything. It’s meant as a subtle tribute!"

Reception
Ready Player One was a New York Times bestseller. Among those praising the book were Entertainment Weekly, The Boston Globe, The A.V. Club, CNN.com, io9, and Boing Boing. USA Today wrote that the novel "undoubtedly qualifies Cline as the hottest geek on the planet right now." NPR said that the book was "ridiculously fun and large-hearted". Cline "takes a far-out premise and engages the reader instantly" with a "deeply felt narrative [that] makes it almost impossible to stop turning the pages." Janet Maslin of The New York Times wrote that "The book gets off to a witty start" but noted that it lacks at least one dimension, stating that gaming had overwhelmed everything else about this book. Rebecca Serle of HuffPost described the book as "the grown-up's Harry Potter" and that it "has it all – nostalgia, trivia, adventure, romance, heart and, dare I say it, some very fascinating social commentary." The book has been translated into over 20 languages.

Discussion on the book was renewed in the months leading up to the release of Steven Spielberg’s film adaptation. In contrast to the book’s contemporary reviews, which were generally positive, these were substantially more negative and triggered a social media backlash towards the book and the then upcoming film adaptation. Nick Shager, writing for The Daily Beast, offered a scathing review that criticized the book's narrative style by stating "It’s... a terribly written piece of adolescent fantasy that, at heart, exemplifies everything wrong and repellent about modern nerd culture" and challenged its coming-of-age premise by calling it "a stunted-adolescent story". Regarding the abundance of pop culture references, Shager called the book "an unbearable celebration of nostalgic juvenilia". He summarized his argument against the book by stating "It’s a lionization of immature things (and immaturity) as an end to itself, rather than as the building blocks of more mature – and worthwhile – creations". Shager also lamented the book's "Peter Pan-ish infatuation with childishness, which comes coated in a stench of stale Doritos, Jolt Cola and lowbrow smugness".

Michael J. Nelson's and Conor Lastowka's podcast series 372 Pages We'll Never Get Back dissected the book, criticizing it for defective worldbuilding, repetitive and excessive pop culture references in place of descriptive writing, and weak plot.  

In 2018, the book garnered negative reception from critics who believed it pandered too much on the male demographic, which other online publications later disputed. Writer Chris Isaac of Tor disagreed with the criticisms, stating "So, if you don’t like Ready Player One and have criticisms about it, that’s totally understandable" while adding "I’ll certainly point out the issues I have with his stories, but I’m not going to delight in mocking his work or hoping for his failure like many did with Meyer and Twilight." Constance Grady of Vox described in an article about how Gamergate have changed the perception of the book over time: "For readers in Cline’s target demographic in 2011, that message felt empowering. For readers who weren’t, it felt like a harmless piece of affirmation meant for someone else. Everyone deserves a silly escapist fantasy, right?" to "But in this world [...] only things that affect straight white dudes really matter".

Continuation

Short story 
Lacero, a fan-fiction short story by Andy Weir, was published online in 2014, and later included in the 2016 limited edition of Ready Player One published by Subterranean Press.

It functions as a precursor to the main novel, and is considered canonical to the Ready Player One fictional universe.

Sequel novel

As early as 2015, Cline had been reported to be working on a sequel to Ready Player One from screenwriter Zak Penn. Cline confirmed the sequel was in progress by December 2017, and would have a different story-line involving all of the characters, while still exploring pop culture references like the first book. Penguin House released the sequel, Ready Player Two on November 24, 2020. The plot follows Wade as he embarks on a new quest after discovering a new technology developed by Halliday. Between the weeks of November 29 and December 20 of 2020, it was number one on Amazon's fiction chart.

In other media

Easter egg hunt promotion
Ten months after the first edition's release, Cline revealed on his blog that Ready Player One itself contained an elaborately hidden Easter egg. This clue would form the first part of a series of staged video gaming tests, similar to the plot of the novel. Cline also revealed that the competition's grand prize would be a DeLorean. The Easter egg was a URL hidden in the book for anoraksalmanac.com.  This was the first stage of the contest where the 2011 Atari 2600 game The Stacks by developers Mike Mika & Kevin Wilson was featured.  The game Ultimate Collector: Garage Sale by Austin-based developer Portalarium was featured in the second stage of the contest. The final stage of the contest was announced on August 1, 2012, and was to set a world record on one of several classic arcade or Atari 2600 games. This was completed on August 9, 2012 by Craig Queen, who set a new world record in Joust. He was awarded the DeLorean on the TV series X-Play.

Film adaptation

The film rights were purchased by Warner Bros. on the same day Cline finalized his publishing deal with Random House, one year prior to the novel's publication. Dan Farah brought the project into the studio and produced it with Donald De Line. Cline adapted his novel into a screenplay. Over the years, Eric Eason and Zak Penn assisted Cline with rewrites.

Steven Spielberg signed on to direct in March 2015. Spielberg and Kristie Macosko Krieger of Amblin Partners also joined Deline and Farah as producers. Warner Bros. initially announced a release date of December 15, 2017. On February 9, 2016, the release date was pushed back to March 30, 2018, to avoid competition with Star Wars: The Last Jedi. The movie began production in the spring of 2016 and was filmed in both the United States and the United Kingdom.

On June 9, 2016, Variety stated that Spielberg's regular collaborator John Williams was planning on composing the film's score. However, scheduling conflicts with another Spielberg film, The Post, led to Spielberg signing Alan Silvestri for the score.

The film stars Tye Sheridan, Olivia Cooke, Ben Mendelsohn, Lena Waithe, T. J. Miller, Simon Pegg, and Mark Rylance with Philip Zao, Win Morisaki, and Hannah John-Kamen in supporting roles. It premiered at South by Southwest on March 11, 2018, and was theatrically released by Warner Bros. in the United States on March 29, 2018. It received generally positive reviews from critics who praised its visuals and brisk pacing, the performances of Sheridan and Rylance, and noted it as an improvement on the book. The film nonetheless received criticism for its lack of character development and its "achingly regressive" view of pop culture fans.

See also
 Virtual reality in fiction
 LitRPG
 Metaverse

Notes

  The terms "Ch.." and "p." are shortened forms for chapter and page, and refer to chapters and pages in the Ready Player One novel in its first American edition.

References

External links

 
 
 Excerpts from the book from Scribd

2011 American novels
2011 science fiction novels
Books about video games
Crossover fiction
Fiction set in 2045
Novels set in the 2040s
Action novels
American novels adapted into films
American science fiction novels
Cyberpunk novels
Dystopian novels
Fictional video games
Massively multiplayer online role-playing games in fiction
Novels about virtual reality
Novels set in Columbus, Ohio
Novels set in Oklahoma
Novels by Ernest Cline
2011 debut novels
Haptic technology
Crown Publishing Group books